Vista (Spanish for "view") is a city in San Diego County, California. Vista is a medium-sized city within the San Diego-Carlsbad, CA Metropolitan Area and has a population of 101,638. Vista's sphere of influence also includes portions of unincorporated San Diego County to the north and east, with a county island in the central west.

A flag is displayed at the Vista Civic Center. The flag design is the seal of Vista on a blue background.

Originally the lands of Rancho Buena Vista and Rancho Guajome, Vista was founded on October 9, 1882, with the establishment of a post office. It was incorporated on January 28, 1963, and became a charter city on June 13, 2007.

Vista has more than 25 educational institutions for youth, and a business park home to over 800 companies. In a 2015 review, Vista was ranked as the 173rd-best place in California (out of 240) for families, based on factors such as family life, recreational opportunities, education, health, safety, and affordability.

History

The Vista area was originally inhabited by the Luiseño Indians, who established a village in today's Vista called Tovalum.

The prosperity of the mission-era declined by the 1830s with the independence of Mexico from Spain. The Mexican government began to grant land ownerships to a variety of people, thus beginning the Rancho era of California. Three ranchos were granted in the Vista area: Rancho Guajome, Rancho Buena Vista, and Agua Hedionda Y los Manos.

In the 1850s the ranchos began to fade due to changing political conditions and the scarcity of water. A growing number of settlers came to the area after California became a state in 1850 and began to create smaller agricultural holdings. One settler in the Vista area, John A. Frazier, applied to open the first post office and after several attempts to name the city (Frazier and Buena Vista were already taken), Frazier finally chose the name "Vista". With the opening of the first post office in 1882, Vista had officially arrived.

In 1870, Bernard Delpy arrived from France to build what eventually became known as "Delpy Corners" at the intersection of today's East Vista Way and Foothill Drive. His nephew, Jules Jacques Delpy, joined him in 1879 and together they planted several hundred acres of grapes. In 1886, they built the first successful winery in the country. The winery was shut down by the Prohibition era.

Inhibited by the lack of water, Vista grew slowly through the early 1910s to less than 1,000 people. With the vote of the people in 1923, the Vista Irrigation District had the necessary funding to construct a new water supply from Lake Henshaw. New buildings in downtown sprang up almost immediately. Agriculture began to flourish with crops such as tomatoes, celery, and citrus fruits. Some hillsides were also planted for avocados and by 1948, Vista became the "avocado capital of the world"

Following World War II, agriculture declined with an influx of population and housing. The City of Vista was incorporated on January 23, 1963. The frequent housing booms of the 1970s through early 2000s greatly increased the population of Vista. Numerous apartment complexes were also built in these booms. Many light manufacturing businesses moved into the Business Park area on the south side, starting in the 1980s. In the 1990s, Wal-Mart, Target and Costco opened large stores. In 1993, Vista became involved in a national controversy when the Vista Unified School District board unsuccessfully tried to incorporate creationist, anti-evolution views into the biology curriculum.

Geography and climate

Vista is a hilly city. Most of the businesses are located in the flatter areas, and residences climb the hills. In undeveloped areas, the natural vegetation types includes chaparral brushland, oak-sycamore woodland, riparian (stream) woodland and oak-grass savanna. The natural vegetation is best seen in Buena Vista Park on the south side, in the San Marcos Hills, east of the city, and in undeveloped pockets on the north side (e.g. along Gopher Canyon Road and Guajome Regional Park).

Climate
Vista has a semi-arid climate (Köppen: Bsk) bordering on a Mediterranean climate (Csa). The climate is temperate, with extremes of temperature uncommon. Coastal breezes and foggy overcast (especially in May and June) keep the late spring/early summer high temperatures below . on most days. In general, the western side of the city (closer to the Pacific) is cooler and more overcast with ocean fog than the eastern side. It is common in May–June for the western side of Vista to be overcast and cool, while the eastern side basks in clear skies and sunshine. July, August and September are usually warmer, as the coastal breezes lessen. High temperatures also accompany dry Santa Ana wind events, which can strike any month, but are most common during fall. On 90% of days, though, the moderating influence of the nearby Pacific keeps the weather pleasant and temperatures moderate. Frost is quite rare in winter, and snowfall almost unknown. Most of the annual rainfall of  falls between November and April (Mediterranean climate type). The moderate climate has made Vista and surrounding areas a center of the plant nursery industry. Avocados and other subtropical plants thrive in the area.

Demographics

2010
The 2010 United States Census reported that Vista had a population of 93,834. The racial makeup of Vista was 59,551 (63.5%) White, 3,137 (3.3%) Black, 1,103 (1.2%) Native American, 3,979 (4.2%) Asian, 677 (0.7%) Pacific Islander, 20,423 (21.8%) from other races, and 4,964 (5.3%) from two or more races. Hispanic or Latino of any race were 45,380 persons (48.4%).

The Census reported that 91,789 people (97.8% of the population) lived in households, 661 (0.7%) lived in non-institutionalized group quarters, and 1,384 (1.5%) were institutionalized.

There were 29,317 households, out of which 12,139 (41.4%) had children under the age of 18 living in them, 15,024 (51.2%) were opposite-sex married couples living together, 4,030 (13.7%) had a female householder with no husband present, 2,065 (7.0%) had a male householder with no wife present. There were 2,143 (7.3%) unmarried opposite-sex partnerships, and 236 (0.8%) same-sex married couples or partnerships. 5,784 households (19.7%) were made up of individuals, and 1,963 (6.7%) had someone living alone who was 65 years of age or older. The average household size was 3.13. There were 21,119 families (72.0% of all households); the average family size was 3.55.

The population was spread out, with 25,074 people (26.7%) under the age of 18, 11,738 people (12.5%) aged 18 to 24, 27,659 people (29.5%) aged 25 to 44, 20,690 people (22.0%) aged 45 to 64, and 8,673 people (9.2%) who were 65 years of age or older. The median age was 31.1 years. For every 100 females, there were 100.7 males. For every 100 females age 18 and over, there were 99.9 males.

The homeowner vacancy rate was 2.2%; the rental vacancy rate was 5.9%. 44,897 people (47.8% of the population) lived in owner-occupied housing units and 46,892 people (50.0%) lived in rental housing units.

2000
As of the census of 2000, there were 89,857 people, 28,877 households, and 20,791 families residing in the city. The population density was 4,810.0 inhabitants per square mile (1,857.3/km2). The racial makeup of the city was 64.3% White, 4.2% African American, 1.0% Native American, 3.7% Asian, 0.7% Pacific Islander, 21.3% from other races, and 4.8% from two or more races. Hispanic or Latino residents of any race were 38.9% of the population.

There were 28,877 households, out of which 40.4% had children under the age of 18 living with them, 53.7% were married couples living together, 12.7% had a female householder with no husband present, and 28.0% were non-families. 20.5% of all households were made up of individuals, and 7.2% had someone living alone who was 65 years of age or older. The average household size was 3.03 and the average family size was 3.48. The FBI crime index for 2005 was 32.9 for every 1000 residents.

In the city, the population was spread out, with 29.7% under the age of 18, 11.4% from 18 to 24, 32.7% from 25 to 44, 16.2% from 45 to 64, and 10.0% who were 65 years of age or older. The median age was 30 years. For every 100 females, there were 99.8 males. For every 100 females age 18 and over, there were 98.7 males.

The median income for a household in the city was $42,594, and the median income for a family was $45,649. Males had a median income of $32,936 versus $25,812 for females. The per capita income for the city was $18,027. About 10.0% of families and 14.2% of the population were below the poverty line, including 19.0% of those under age 18 and 6.1% of those age 65 or over.

Current estimates
According to estimates by the San Diego Association of Governments, the median household income of Vista in 2011 was $59,414 (not adjusted for inflation). When adjusted for inflation (2010 dollars; comparable to Census data above), the median household income was $57,665.

Economy

Top employers

According to the city's 2019 Comprehensive Annual Financial Report, the top employers in the city are:

Government

City government 
Vista, a charter city, is governed by a mayor, John B. Franklin, and a city council, consisting of Corrina Contreras (Deputy Mayor), Joe Green, Katie Melendez and Daniel O'Donnell.

Public safety 
Law enforcement is provided by the San Diego County Sheriff's Department through a contract with the City of Vista, approved by the City Council. Fire suppression, fire prevention and EMS is provided by the Vista Fire Department.

State and federal representation

According to the San Diego County Registrar of Voters, on November 1, 2016, the City of Vista had more registered Democrats than Republicans. Out of a total of 40,837 registered voters, 13,859 were Democrats, and 13,507 were Republicans.

Education
The Vista Unified School District serves Vista and parts of Oceanside and several Unincorporated communities, with eighteen elementary schools, six middle schools, and seven high schools, including Rancho Buena Vista High School, Vista High School and Mission Vista High School. Guajome Park Academy is a charter school with joint elementary, middle, and high schools that receives part of its funding from the Vista Unified School District. Alta Vista Continuation High School is another option for teens who cannot attend regular school. There are 12 private schools serving over 2,500 students, including Tri-City Christian School, St. Francis of Assisi Catholic School and Calvary Christian School. Vista Adult School was established in 1977 by the Vista Unified School District. Vista Adult School is a provider of adult education services in the City of Vista and its surrounding communities. Vista Adult School offers adult education courses for adults in the areas of: high school diploma, GED, HISET, adult basic education, ESL, parenting classes, community education courses, and career technical education courses (CTE). Vista Adult School also offers a robust selection of short-term medical training courses such as: Medical Terminology, Healthcare Essentials, Medical Assistant, Pharmacy Technician, Phlebotomy, and Medical Billing and Coding. Vista Adult School is a member of the Education to Career Network of North San Diego County (ETCN). Vista Adult School/Vista Unified School District serve as the fiscal agent for Education to Career Network. ETCN is one of 71 Consortiums in the State of California.

Vista was mentioned in The Los Angeles Times when a group of social conservatives associated with the Christian right were elected to the Vista Unified School District's school board and tried to implement creationism into the curriculum in the early 1990s.

Biola University has a branch campus in Vista. Brightwood College (formerly known as Kaplan College) had a campus in Vista until the college's sudden closure in 2018.

Recreation
Vista is home to two city-owned theaters: the recently updated Moonlight Amphitheatre and the Avo Playhouse. The Moonlight is an open-air theater that specializes in musical productions, performing several Broadway-caliber, musical productions during the course of the summer. A winter season concert venue called ClubM hosts shows where the performance and audience areas are on the Moonlight stage, sheltered from the elements. The Avo Playhouse located in Historic Downtown Vista is rented year round for private performances.

Several popular downtown events include the North County St. Patrick's Day Parade & Festival, the Vista Strawberry Festival, the Vista Rod Run (over 25 years running) and the annual Winterfest & Christmas Parade.

Vista houses one movie theater, currently a Cinepolis theater (as of 2015), but which opened as a Krikorian Cinema in fall 2003.

Two of the best-known parks in the city are Brengle Terrace Park and Guajome County Park. Brengle Terrace Park houses the Moonlight Amphitheatre, Alta Vista Gardens (a city-owned botanical garden), two softball fields, a senior center, a playground, and the city community center, where the main offices of the city's day camps are held. Guajome County Park has  of land, which is shared between Vista and nearby Oceanside. It features a small lake, willow and oak woodlands, campsites, horse trails, and the Rancho Guajome Adobe, a National Historic Landmark. Buena Vista Park on the south side of Vista is a natural park where users can hike on trails through native chaparral and oak woodland.

The Rancho Guajome Adobe and Rancho Buena Vista Adobe are two historic rancho buildings in Vista, built in the mid-nineteenth century, both available for tours and special occasions.

The city's Parks and Recreation Department runs the Wave Waterpark, a small but well-equipped waterpark in the downtown area open from mid-spring to early fall, and the brand new Vista Community Sports Park. Another attraction is the Antique Gas and Steam Engine Museum, an open-air museum demonstrating agricultural equipment from the 19th and early 20th centuries. A Boomers family fun park is also located in Vista.

Vista is home to a Japanese-American Cultural Center and Buddhist Temple (one of only two in California), a mosque, and over 75 other churches and temples of various denominations.

Media

Radio stations
AM 1000 KCEO

TV stations
KHAX-LD channel 17 is a translator of KBNT-LP channel 17 in San Diego.

Newspapers
Daily newspaper service is provided by the regional San Diego Union-Tribune.

Infrastructure
The automobile is the primary means of transportation within the city of Vista, however bus service is provided by the North County Transit District (NCTD) BREEZE. NCTD has an east–west lightweight commuter train called the Sprinter with a stop in downtown Vista and another further east on Civic Center Drive near Highway 78.

Major roads and highways

 State Route 78
 Vista Village Drive/East Vista 
Way
West Vista Way
 Santa Fe Avenue
Bobier Drive
Civic Center Drive 
Melrose Drive
Sycamore Avenue
Shadowridge Drive
Emerald Drive
 Santa Fe Avenue

Mass transit
The North County Transit District operates a bus system and a light rail system, Sprinter, with stations at Vista Transit Center and Civic Center Drive within city limits and also the Buena Creek Road in eastern Vista sphere of influence. The Sprinter provides service, west to Oceanside and east to San Marcos and Escondido. From the Sprinter station in Oceanside, commuters can connect to Amtrak trains, or to the Coaster commuter trains to downtown San Diego, or to the Metrolink commuter trains to the Los Angeles area.

Utilities
In the city of Vista, gas and electric service is provided by San Diego Gas & Electric, while water is provided by the Vista Irrigation District. Sewerage is provided by the City of Vista.

Healthcare
The city of Vista is located within the Tri-City Hospital District, which provides emergency care and hospitalization, while ambulance service is provided by the Vista Fire Department. The Vista Community Clinic provides general health care to those who face economic, social or cultural barriers.

Government facilities

Located in Vista is the North County Regional Center, a San Diego County facility shared by the Superior Court, Sheriff, Vista Detention Facility jail, Probation, District Attorney, Revenue and Recovery, and the County Board of Supervisors. The North County Superior Court is a full service branch court.

Notable people
 Carrie Prejean, Miss California 2009
 Darrell Issa, U.S. representative for California's 48th congressional district, former U.S. representative for California's 49th congressional district and chair of the House Oversight and Government Reform Committee
Red Killefer, professional baseball player
Katherine "Scottie" MacGregor, actress, most notably in television series Little House on the Prairie
Danny Way, skateboarder
Rudolph B. Davila, World War II Medal of Honor recipient
Allan Holdsworth, British guitarist and composer.
Dave Roberts, manager of the Los Angeles Dodgers; former Major League outfielder
Tony Wolters, catcher for the Colorado Rockies,
Don Prudhomme, retired drag racer and businessman
Sara Watkins, singer-songwriter and fiddler
Sean Watkins, singer-songwriter and guitarist, best known for being in the band Nickel Creek, the duo Fiction Family and the supergroup Works Progress Administration
Alan S. Thompson, retired U.S. Navy Vice Admiral and former director of the Defense Logistics Agency
Leon Hall, defensive back for NFL's Oakland Raiders
Pisa Tinoisamoa, retired NFL linebacker
 Bob Burnquist, Brazilian skater
 Cove Reber, singer-songwriter; lead vocalist of Saosin from 2004 to 2010 and Dead American
 Michael Damian, actor known for The Young & The Restless
 Kirby Wright, poet and writer 
 Heather Youmans, singer, actress, and contestant on American Idol

Sports
North County Cobras, semi-professional football team, founded 2008

References

External links

 
 Vista Historical Society & Museum
 Vista Chamber of Commerce
 The Vista Press – Community News
 

 
Cities in San Diego County, California
North County (San Diego County)
San Diego metropolitan area
Incorporated cities and towns in California
Populated places established in 1963
1963 establishments in California